Hanagata (written: 花形 lit. "floral pattern") is a Japanese surname. Notable people with the surname include:

, Japanese voice actress
, Japanese manga artist
, Japanese boxer

Japanese-language surnames